Torre Mondovì is a comune (municipality) in the Province of Cuneo in the Italian region Piedmont, located about  south of Turin and about  east of Cuneo.

Torre Mondovì borders the following municipalities: Monasterolo Casotto, Montaldo di Mondovì, Pamparato, Roburent, San Michele Mondovì, and Vicoforte.

References

Cities and towns in Piedmont